Milkfish congee is a Taiwanese breakfast dish consisting of a congee with milkfish belly. The dish is typically served with pepper and chopped spring onions and is often eaten at breakfast. Originating from Tainan, the dish is considered one of the national dishes of Taiwan. Recently, the dish is starting to gain popularity in the United States.

Culinary method
Usually, milkfish bone is used to boil the broth, which is then used as a base for the congee. The congee soup is seasoned with pepper and chopped spring onions. One difficulty in preparing this dish is that milkfish has many tiny fish bones, making it hard to eat. Thus, milkfish farmers in southern Taiwan usually send them to processing plants to pick out the fish bones first, so the dish is also known as boneless milkfish belly congee.

See also

 List of fish dishes
 Taiwanese cuisine
 Eel noodles

References

Taiwanese rice dishes
Fish dishes
National dishes
Taiwanese cuisine
Congee